The 55th Division was an infantry division of the British Army, which was first formed in 1902 and finally disbanded in 1945. The division was commanded by a general officer commanding (GOC). In this role, he would receive orders from a level above him in the chain of command, and then use the forces within the division to undertake the mission assigned. In addition to directing the tactical battle the division was involved in, the GOC oversaw a staff and the administrative, logistical, medical, training, and discipline of the division. The 55th Division had 20 different permanent GOCs over its 37–year history.

In the opening years of the 20th century, the British Army implemented a series of reforms based on lessons learnt during the Second Boer War (1899–1902). This included the formation of the Territorial Force in 1907, and the West Lancashire Division the following year. The initial intent for the force, and the division, was to take over the defence of the country when the regular army was abroad on military service. At the time of its creation, territorials were limited to only serving within the UK. As European tensions increased, the Imperial Service Obligation was introduced in 1910. This allowed territorials to volunteer for overseas service, and it was believed that at least one quarter of the men would volunteer for oversea service on the outbreak of war. Following the start of the First World War, in 1914, and through into 1915, those who had volunteered were transferred to formations fighting on Western Front in France. Those who did not volunteer, were used to form the 2nd West Lancashire Division and by April 1915 the West Lancashire Division had ceased to exist. The division was reformed as the 55th (West Lancashire) Division, in France during January 1916. It proceeded to fight in the battles of the Somme, Passchendaele, Cambrai, Estaires, and the Hundred Days Offensive. Between being reformed and the end of hostilities, the division suffered almost 36,000 casualties, with 6,520 men killed. The division was demobolised in Belgium in 1920, and then reformed in the UK. 

In 1921, the Territorial Force was reconstituted as the Territorial Army (TA), and the division became part of the latter. In 1938, the 55th was reorganized as a motor division that saw a decrease in infantry and artillery allocated to it, but an increase in motor vehicles. The intended design was for the formation to be able to keep pace with an armoured division, and consolidate territory by the former. As tensions increased between Germany and the United Kingdom and its allies, the TA was expanded in 1939 and the 55th assisted in the creation of the 59th (Staffordshire) Motor Division. During the Second World War, which broke out in September 1939, the division did not leave the United Kingdom. In June 1940, the motor division concept was abandoned, and the division was reorganised as an infantry formation and was then known as the 55th (West Lancashire) Infantry Division. The division was used to defend the UK from a potential German invasion, as a training formation, and a source of reinforcements for formations fighting overseas. The division was also used for deception purposes and was included within the Operation Fortitude effort, to within divert German resources away from Normandy, France, where Allied forces would land to start the process of liberating German-occupied Western Europe. At the end of the war, the remnant of the division was disbanded when the British army demobilised. The TA was reformed in 1947, on a much smaller scale, and did not include the 55th.

General officer commanding

Notes

References

 
 
 
 
 
 
 
 
 
 
 
 
 
 
 
 
 
 
 

British Army personnel by war
British Army personnel of World War I
British Army personnel of World War II
British Army general officer commanding lists